The 12625 / 12626 Kerala Superfast Express is a daily superfast express train of the Indian Railways that runs between  and Thiruvananthapuram in Kerala state. It is currently the longest-running daily Superfast train of Indian Railways (3027 km) and second-longest daily train in country after Avadh Assam Express (3115 km). It is the second direct train to Kerala (1977) from the national capital Delhi after Jayanti Janata Express (1973) and first direct train connecting the state capital and Southern Kerala with New Delhi.

History
The Kerala Express was introduced in 1977 as a split train named Kerala–Karnataka (KK) Express. The composition of Karnataka–Kerala Express has been increased from 14 coaches to 21 coaches with effect from 29 January 1981.

The train is running with LHB rakes with effect from 4 November 2018.

On 10 June 2019, during the 2019 Indian heat wave, four pilgrims from Tamil Nadu died due to heat exposure in the Kerala Express as it traveled south through the Bundelkhand, before the train arrived at Jhansi Junction.

Route & Halts

Traction
It is hauled by a Royapuram / Erode based WAP 7 locomotive from end to end.

See also
 Ernakulam Town
 Karnataka Express
 Kerala Sampark Kranti Express
 Mangala Lakshadweep Express
 Trivandrum Central

References

Express trains in India
Named passenger trains of India
Rail transport in Delhi
Rail transport in Kerala